The Italian Army in Russia (ARMIR) was an army-sized unit of the Regio Esercito (Royal Italian Army) which fought on the Eastern Front during World War II between July 1942 and April 1943. The ARMIR was also known as the 8th Italian Army and initially had 235,000 soldiers.

Formation
In July 1942, the ARMIR was created when Italian dictator Benito Mussolini decided to scale up the Italian effort in the Soviet Union. The existing Italian Expeditionary Corps in Russia (Corpo di Spedizione Italiano in Russia, or CSIR) was expanded to become the ARMIR. Unlike the "mobile" CSIR which it replaced, the ARMIR was primarily an infantry army. A good portion of the ARMIR was made up of mountain troops (Alpini), which were ill-suited to the vast, flat expanses of southern Russia.

Like the CSIR, the ARMIR included an Aviation Command (Comando Aereo) with a limited number of fighters, bombers, and transport aircraft. This command was part of the Regia Aeronautica (lit. "Royal Air Force") and was also known as the Corpo Aereo Spedizione in Russia ("Air Expeditionary Corps in Russia"), under the command of General Enrico Pezzi. The ARMIR was subordinated to German Army Group B (Heeresgruppe B) commanded by General Maximilian von Weichs. In February 1943, after its near destruction during the Battle of Stalingrad, Mussolini disbanded what was left of the Italian 8th Army and the surviving Italian troops were unceremoniously brought home from Russia.

Composition

Mussolini sent seven new divisions to Russia for a total of ten divisions. Four new infantry divisions were sent: the 2nd Infantry Division "Sforzesca", the 3rd Infantry Division "Ravenna", the 5th Infantry Division "Cosseria", and the 156th Infantry Division "Vicenza". In addition to the infantry divisions, three new alpine divisions made up of Alpini were sent: the 2nd Alpine Division "Tridentina", the 3rd Alpine Division "Julia", and the 4th Alpine Division "Cuneense". These new divisions were added to the 3rd Cavalry Division "Principe Amedeo Duca d'Aosta", 9th Infantry Division "Pasubio", and 52nd Infantry Division "Torino", which were already in Russia as part of the CSIR.

The 8th Italian Army was organized into three corps: 
 II Army Corps (Giovanni Zanghieri), 
2nd Infantry Division "Sforzesca" (Carlo Pellegrini), 
3rd Infantry Division "Ravenna" (Francesco Du Pont), 
5th Infantry Division "Cosseria" (Enrico Gazzale)
 XXXV Army Corps (Giovanni Messe - replaced 1942.11.01 by Francesco Zingales), 
3rd Cavalry Division "Principe Amedeo Duca d'Aosta" (Ettore de Blasio), 
9th Infantry Division "Pasubio" (Guido Boselli), 
52nd Infantry Division "Torino" (Roberto Lerici), 
 Alpine Corps (Gabriele Nasci). 
2nd Alpine Division "Tridentina" (Luigi Reverberi), 
3rd Alpine Division "Julia" (Umberto Ricagno - POW), 
4th Alpine Division "Cuneense" (Emilio Battisti - POW)
 Under direct command of the 8th Army
156th Infantry Division "Vicenza" (Etelvoldo Pascolini - POW), primarily utilized behind the front on "lines of communications" duties, security and anti-partisan and to act as a reserve. 
In addition to the ten divisions, the 8th Italian Army included 
 298th German Division
 62nd German divisions (later being sent to Stalingrad), 
 a Croatian volunteer legion, 
 three legions of Italian Blackshirt volunteers (Camicie Nere, or CC.NN.).

By November 1942, the 8th Italian Army had a total of 235,000 men in twelve divisions and four legions. It was equipped with 988 guns, 420 mortars, 25,000 horses, and 17,000 vehicles. While the Italians did receive 12 German Mk. IV tanks and had captured several Soviet tanks, there were still very few modern tanks and anti-tank guns available to the ARMIR. The few tanks that were available still tended to be obsolete Italian models. Both the L6/40 light tanks (armed with a turret-mounted 20 mm Breda Model 35 gun) and the 47 mm anti-tank guns (Cannone da 47/32 M35) were out of date when Italy declared war on 10 June 1940. Compared to what the Soviets had available to them in late 1942 and early 1943, Italian tanks and anti-tank guns could be considered more dangerous to the crews than to the enemy. Moreover, as was the complaint of General Messe with the CSIR, the ARMIR was seriously short of adequate winter equipment. Infantry small arms were also often inadequate or even useless. Rifles and machine guns were terribly prone to jamming. The Carcano rifle and the Breda 30 light machine gun had to be kept for a long time on a source of heat to work properly in extreme climatic conditions, and thus were often not capable of firing in the midst of battle. Incidentally, these last two weapons were considered the deadliest among the Italian arsenal. The heavy Breda M37 proved to be a slightly more reliable machine gun, though having an excessive weight and very slow rate of fire. The old belt-fed Fiat 14 was also seen in small numbers, but was obsolete. The praised high-quality Beretta 38A submachine guns were extremely rare, and given only in small numbers to specialized units, such as the Blackshirt legions, some tank crews or Carabinieri military police. Italian paratroopers in North Africa were equipped exclusively with this weapon, and gave outstanding combat results. There was total absence of any portable anti-tank weapon, thus making hand grenades, machine guns and mortars the last resort against Soviet armour. Hand grenades rarely detonated or detonated unpredictably. The Brixia Model 35 45mm mortar bombs had an inadequate explosive charge and fragmented poorly, and larger 81mm mortars modello 35 were rare.

The Aviation Command of the ARMIR had a total of roughly 64 aircraft. The ARMIR had the following aircraft available to it:  Macchi C.200 “Arrow" (Saetta) fighter, Macchi C.202 “Lightning" (Folgore) fighter, Caproni Ca.311 light reconnaissance-bomber, and Fiat Br.20 “Stork" (Cicogna) twin-engined bomber.

Commander

Italian General Italo Gariboldi took command of the newly formed ARMIR, instead of General Giovanni Messe. As commander of the CSIR, Messe had opposed an enlargement of the Italian contingent in Russia until it could be properly equipped. As a result, he was overruled by Mussolini and the CSIR was expanded without his further input. 
Just prior to commanding the ARMIR, Gariboldi was the Governor-General of Italian Libya. He was criticized after the war for being too submissive to the Germans in North Africa.
Messe remained commander of the 3 initial divisions of the CSIR, which was renamed XXXV Army Corps, but was subordinate to Gariboldi.
He was replaced by Francesco Zingales in November 1942.

Main operations 

In late summer 1942, after participating in the conquest of eastern Ukraine, the highly-mobile riflemen (Bersaglieri) of the ARMIR eliminated the Soviet bridgehead at Serafimovič on the Don river. Then, with the support of German tanks, the Garibaldi troops repelled a Soviet attack during the first defensive battle of the Don.

Finally the ARMIR faced Operation Little Saturn in December 1942. The aim of this Soviet operation was the complete annihilation of the Italian 8th Army, as a result of the operations related to the Battle of Stalingrad.

On 11 December 1942 the Soviet 63rd Army, backed by T-34 tanks and fighter-bombers, first attacked the weakest Italian sector. This sector was held on the right by the Ravenna and Cosseria infantry divisions. Indeed, from the Soviet bridgehead at Mamon, 15 divisions—supported by at least 100 tanks—attacked the Italian Cosseria and Ravenna Divisions, and although outnumbered 9 to 1, the Italians resisted until 19 December, when ARMIR headquarters finally ordered the battered divisions to withdraw. Only before Christmas both divisions were driven back and defeated, after heavy and bloody fighting.

Meanwhile, on 17 December 1942, the Soviet 21st Army and the Soviet 5th Tank Army attacked and defeated what remained of the Romanians to the right of the Italians. At about the same time, the Soviet 3rd Tank Army and parts of the Soviet 40th Army hit the Hungarians to the left of the Italians. This resulted in a collapse of the Axis front, north of Stalingrad: the ARMIR was encircled, but for some days the Italian troops were able—with huge casualties—to stop the attacking Soviet troops.

The Soviet 1st Guards Army then attacked the Italian center which was held by the 298th German, the Pasubio, the Torino, the Prince Amedeo Duke of Aosta, and the Sforzesca divisions. After eleven days of bloody fighting against overwhelming Soviet forces, these divisions were surrounded and defeated and Russian air support resulted in the death of General Paolo Tarnassi, commander of the Italian armoured force in Russia.

On 14 January 1943, after a short pause, the 6th Soviet Army attacked the divisions of the Alpine Corps. These units had been placed on the left flank of the Italian army and, to date, were still relatively unaffected by the battle. However, the Alpini’s position had turned critical after the collapse of the Italian center, the collapse of the Italian right flank, and the simultaneous collapse of the Hungarian troops to the left of the Alpini. The Julia Division and Cuneense Division were destroyed. Members of the 1 Alpini Regiment, part of Cuneese Division, burned the regimental flags to keep them from being captured. Part of the Tridentina Division and other withdrawing troops managed to escape the encirclement.

On 26 January 1943, the Alpini remnants breached the encirclement and reached new defensive positions set up to the west by the German Army. Many of the troops who managed to escape were frostbitten, critically ill, and deeply demoralized: for practical purposes,  the Italian Army in Russia did not exist anymore by February 1943.

Officially, ARMIR losses were 114,520 of the original 235,000 soldiers

See also
 "Italiani brava gente"
 Charge of the Savoia Cavalleria at Isbuscenskij
 Royal Italian Army during World War II
 Italian participation on the Eastern Front
 Italian prisoners of war in the Soviet Union
 List of military equipment of Germany's allies on the Eastern front
 Light Transport Brigade (Independent State of Croatia)
Armies with the Italian 8th Army and Army Group B at Stalingrad:
 German 2nd Army
 German 6th Army
 German 4th Tank Army
 Hungarian 2nd Army
 Romanian 3rd Army
 Romanian 4th Army

References

Sources
 
 Jowett, Philip S.  The Italian Army 1940–45 (1):  Europe 1940–1943.  Osprey, Oxford – New York, 2000.

Further reading

 Hamilton, H. Sacrifice on the Steppe. Casemate, 2011 (English)

Italy–Soviet Union relations
Field armies of Italy in World War II
Military units and formations established in 1942
Military units and formations disestablished in 1943
Military units and formations of the Soviet–German War